NSD is an open-source server program for the Domain Name System.

NSD may also refer to:

 NASA standard detonator
 Nassi–Shneiderman diagram
 National School of Drama in India
 Norrländska Socialdemokraten, a Swedish newspaper
 Norwegian Social Science Data Services
 National Security Database, India
 United States Department of Justice National Security Division
 National Security Directive of the US George H. W. Bush presidency
 New Serb Democracy, a Montenegrin political party
 National Settlement Depository, a Russian Central securities depository
 Nebraska School for the Deaf
 Nintendo Network Service Database, former Japanese company
 Noise spectral density
 Northshore School District